The United Namibia People's Party was a political party in Namibia. It was formed in 1980, following a split in the SWAPO Democrats. The party leader was Hizipo Shikondombole. The party joined the Namibia National Front in 1989.

Defunct political parties in Namibia